Cartoon Network Arabia is a pan-Arab free-to-air children's television channel that is broadcast to Arab audiences in the Middle East and North Africa. It is one of two Arabic-language versions of the original Cartoon Network, the other being a pay television channel on beIN and additional providers known as Cartoon Network MENA, which is available in both English and Arabic.

The channel launched on 10 October 2010, coinciding with the opening of Turner Broadcasting System Europe's offices in Dubai Media City. As of 2020, it is managed by Warner Bros. Discovery under its International division.

The standard channel broadcasts via Arabsat Badr 6 and Nilesat. Cartoon Network Arabic is considered a free-to-air alternative to Cartoon Network MENA and Boomerang MENA, two pay TV channels offered in the Arab world in HD and in both English and Arabic on beIN Network and additional providers since 1 July 2016, despite the varying differences in programming, schedules, and available languages.

History

Cartoon Network Arabic was launched on 10 October 2010 at 10:10 AM GST. The channel's launch coincided with the opening of Turner Broadcasting System's offices in Dubai Media City, UAE, which is where the channel's local owner is located.

The channel changed its aspect ratio from 4:3 to 16:9 on 5 October 2014; it also began using the Check it 3.0 branding on that day.

Cartoon Network Arabic has changed its website. The new website was changed in May 2015.

On 4 October 2017, the channel has fully rebranded to the Dimensional branding.

In December 2015, Turner Broadcasting System entered an exclusivity deal with the Qatar-based beIN Media Group. This deal led to Cartoon Network Africa, Boomerang Africa, and TCM moving from OSN to the latter's beIN Network service, and also caused the HD feed on YahLive to shut down; the actual channel, however, is unaffected due to being a free-to-air channel on Nilesat and Arabsat/Badr. Cartoon Network Arabic was added to beIN as channel 138 as an HD channel, although the HD version was later replaced with the SD version on Arabsat/Badr. CNN International HD was removed from My-HD's channel list and moved to beIN as an encrypted HD channel along with the pay-only HLN which is in letterboxed SD, but CNN continues to remain available as a free-to-air channel on Nilesat and Arabsat/Badr in SD. However, subscribers to Etisalat and du's IPTV services in the UAE were virtually unaffected at the time. However, due to their direct relations with Turner, UAE Telecoms, Etisalat and Du continue to offer these channels to IPTV subscribers. Additionally, inVision in Saudi Arabia, Ooredoo in Qatar and Cablevision in Lebanon offer Cartoon Network and Boomerang as well.

Programming

TV series
The channel mainly airs animated cartoons from Cartoon Network Studios. Original productions are produced and aired, along with films, shorts, live-action series, and shows from various other studios.

Animated programs aired include original Cartoon Network Studios productions like the Ben 10 reboot, Regular Show, Powerpuff Girls reboot, Uncle Grandpa, Clarence, Adventure Time, and We Bare Bears, as well as programs produced by other studios (such as Hasbro Studios' Transformers: Robots in Disguise, Warner Bros. Animation's Teen Titans Go!, Justice League Action, Rainbow's 44 Cats and Mattel WildBrain's Polly Pocket, My Little Pony: Friendship is Magic etc.). The channel mainly airs animated cartoons from Cartoon Network Studios. Local productions like Mansour are produced and aired along with films, shorts, live-action series, and shows from various other studios.

The channel is one of the only available in Arabic (the other being Spacetoon), with no choice to switch to English or any other languages. This is due to the fact that the channel is a free-to-air TV channel aimed solely at an Arabic-speaking audience.

The channel broadcasts a line of Cartoon Network's own shows dubbed from English. Cartoon Network Arabic has also offered numerous localized shows, suc. has Mansour and the Arabic version of Ben 10: Ultimate Challenge, which are the result of various partnership deals with local production companies, including the Dubai-based Lammtara Pictures (Freej) or the Jordan-based Rubicon Group Holding (Ben & Izzy, Tareq wa Shireen). The channel often edits certain programs for content, cutting out certain scenes due to potentially inappropriate content for Arabs. In 2018, Cartoon Network Arabic started airing Kral Şakir as -ليث the king-.

Shows 

1001 Nights
Adventure Time
Adventure Time: Distant Lands
Angelo Rules
Apple & Onion
Bakugan: Mechtanium Surge
Bakugan: Battle Planet
Batman: The Animated Series
Batman: The Brave and the Bold
Batman Unlimited
Be Cool, Scooby-Doo!
Barbie: It Takes Two
Ben & Izzy
Ben 10 (Original)
Ben 10: Ultimate Challenge
Ben 10: Alien Force
Ben 10: Ultimate Alien
Ben 10: Omniverse
Ben 10 (Reboot)
Ben 10 Challenge
BeyWheelz
Bunnicula
Camp Lazlo
Chowder
Clarence
Cloudy with a Chance of Meatballs
Codename: Kids Next Door
Courage the Cowardly Dog
Craig of the Creek
Danger Mouse
DC Super Hero Girls
Dexter's Laboratory
Dragons: Defenders of Berk
Dragons: Riders of Berk
Dragons: Race to the Edge
Ed, Edd n Eddy
Elliott from Earth
Foster's Home for Imaginary Friends
Friends: Girls on a Mission
Generator Rex
Gormiti Nature Unleashed
Green Lantern: The Animated Series
Hero: 108
Inspector Gadget
Jellystone!
Justice League Action
Looney Tunes
Looney Tunes Cartoons
Mansour
Mao Mao: Heroes of Pure Heart
Matt Hatter Chronicles
Megas XLR
Mixels
Mucha Lucha!
My Gym Partner's a Monkey
My Little Pony: Friendship is Magic
Nexo Knights
Ninjago
Ninja Express
OK K.O.! Let's Be Heroes
Oswaldo
Over the Garden Wall
Legends of Chima
Jelly Jamm
Lego City Adventures
Power Players
Puppy in My Pocket: Adventures in Pocketville
Redakai: Conquer the Kairu
Regular Show
Samurai Jack
Sheep in the Big City
Skatoony
Steven Universe
Supernoobs
Sym-Bionic Titan
Talking Tom and Friends
Teen Titans Go!
The Amazing World of Gumball
The Fungies!
Thomas & Friends: All Engines Go
Wacky Races
Yabba-Dabba Dinosaurs
Tom & Jerry Kids
Mighty Mike
Driver Dan's Story Train
Ha Ha Hairies
Pound Puppies
Gerald McBoing-Boing
A Pup Named Scooby-Doo
Fireman Sam
The Life and Times of Juniper Lee
The Looney Tunes Show
The Marvelous Misadventures of Flapjack
The Powerpuff Girls (Original)
The Powerpuff Girls (Reboot)
The Secret Saturdays
The Smurfs
The Tom and Jerry Show
ThunderCats Roar
Tom and Jerry
Tom and Jerry Tales
Transformers: Prime
Transformers: Robots in Disguise
Transformers: Cyberverse
Uncle Grandpa
Unikitty!
We Bare Bears
What's New, Scooby Doo?
Xiaolin Showdown
Young Justice
Zinba
 Just Kidding
 Level Up
Beat Monsters
Nana Zanana
Toony Tube
Baby Looney Tunes
Alice & Lewis
44 Cats
Taffy
The Happos Family
Pat the Dog
Oddbods
New Looney Tunes
Mr. Bean
Mr. Bean: The Animated Series
Grizzy and the Lemmings
Kingdom Force
Mush-Mush and the Mushables
LazyTown
Dorothy and the Wizard of Oz
Xiaolin Chronicles
DC Super Hero Girls
Sonic Boom
Bill & Tony

Moley
Dino Ranch
Tom and Jerry in New York
Lucas Spider

Films 
Ben 10: Race Against Time (premiered November 5, 2011)
Ben 10: Alien Swarm (premiered November 7, 2011)
Destination: Imagination (premiered November 6, 2011)
Codename: Kids Next Door: Operation: Z.E.R.O. (premiered August 20, 2012)
Ed, Edd n Eddy's Big Picture Show (premiered August 19, 2012)
Camp Lazlo: Where's Lazlo? (premiered August 19, 2012)
Batman Beyond: Return of the Joker (premiered May 8, 2013)
Scooby-Doo! and the Loch Ness Monster (premiered December 5, 2012)
Scooby-Doo and the Cyber Chase (premiered December 12, 2012)
Scooby-Doo! and the Witch's Ghost (premiered December 19, 2012)
Chill Out, Scooby-Doo! (premiered December 26, 2012)
Lego Star Wars: The Yoda Chronicles (premiered September 26, 2013)
Lego Star Wars: The Empire Strikes Out (premiered October 17, 2012)
Lego Star Wars: The Padawan Menace (premiered December 12, 2011)
Free Willy (premiered June 5, 2013)
Free Willy 2: The Adventure Home (premiered June 12, 2013)
Free Willy 3: The Rescue (premiered June 19, 2013)
Cats & Dogs (premiered April 24, 2013)
My Gym Partner's a Monkey: Animal School Musical (premiered October 14, 2013)
Transformers Prime Beast Hunters: Predacons Rising (premiered December 19, 2013)
Ben 10: Secret of the Omnitrix (premiered September 5, 2013)
Ben 10: Destroy All Aliens (premiered March 16, 2012)
Ben 10/Generator Rex: Heroes United (premiered September 26, 2012)
Level Up (premiered July 5, 2012)
Alpha and Omega 2: A Howl-iday Adventure (premiered November 13, 2014)
Alpha and Omega 3: The Great Wolf Games (premiered September 22, 2015)
Over the Garden Wall (premiered June 21, 2015 – July 2, 2015)
Teen Titans: Trouble in Tokyo (premiered April 28, 2016)
Miniseries Adventure Time Stakes Special (premiered May 1, 2016 – May 7, 2016)
Lego DC Comics: Batman Be-Leaguered (premiered December 5, 2014)
Firebreather (premiered December 22, 2011)
¡Mucha Lucha!: The Return of El Maléfico (premiered October 3, 2013)
Willy Wonka & the Chocolate Factory (premiered April 10, 2013)
Tom and Jerry: The Movie (premiered October 25, 2012)
Tom and Jerry: Robin Hood and His Merry Mouse (premiered October 25, 2012)
Tom and Jerry: Shiver Me Whiskers (premiered October 25, 2012)
Tom and Jerry: The Magic Ring (premiered October 25, 2012)
Tom and Jerry: Blast Off to Mars (premiered October 25, 2012)
The Bugs Bunny/Road Runner Movie (premiered July 10, 2013)
Bugs Bunny's 3rd Movie: 1001 Rabbit Tales (premiered July 17, 2013)
Daffy Duck's Fantastic Island (premiered July 24, 2013)
Tweety's High-Flying Adventure (premiered July 31, 2013)
Stuart Little (premiered February 2017)
Stuart Little 2 (premiered February 2017)
Stuart Little 3: Call of the Wild (premiered July 2017)
Regular Show: The Movie (premiered July 5, 2020)
Barbie Princess Adventure (premiered December 6, 2020)
Barbie & Chelsea: The Lost Birthday (premiered April 16, 2021)
Ben 10: Innervasion (premiered January 29, 2021)
Ben 10 Versus the Universe: The Movie (premiered June 18, 2021)
Adventure Time: Distant Lands (premiered May 21, 2021)
We Bare Bears: The Movie (premiered July 4, 2021)

Blocks aired on Cartoon Network Arabic

Current 
 فقرة كارتونيتو "Cartoonito Block" (24 March 2019 – present)

أفلام سي إن "Aflam CN" (19 February 2021 – present)

 كرتون نتورك غير مباشر "Cartoon Network Off Air" (6 December 2020 – present)
سبت الأكشن "Saturday Action" (2018 – present)
 جديد جديد "NEW NEW NEW NEW" (2018 – present)
كرتون نتورك مينيز "Cartoon Network Minis" (September 2017 – present)
 نادي الإفطار "The Breakfast Club" (16 January 2015 – present)

Former 
 على كيفك "Your Choice" (8 April 2011 – November 2014)
 فوازير رمضان "Ramadan Riddles" (1 August 2011 – 2017, Every Ramadan day)
 أفلام العيد "Holiday Movies" (5 November 2011 – 2017, Every Holiday day)
 فقرة كارتونيتو "Cartoonito Block" (4 September 2011 – 1 April 2014)
 تسالي يوليو "Entertainment in July" (July 2011 – July)
 أحلى اثنين "Funday Monday" (September 2013 – December 2013)
 ساعة البطل "Hero Hour" (September 2013 – November 2013)
 إلى كأس العالم "To the World Cup" (June 2014 – July 2014)
 الكوميديا في يناير "The Comedy in January" (Every January 2012)
 القوة القصوى "Maximum Power" (4 January 2015 – 17 June 2015)
 قطط وكلاب "Dogs and Cats" (2016)
 أبطال كرتون نتورك "Cartoon Network Heroes" (2016 – 2020)
مغامرين سي إن "CN Adventures" (2019 – 2021)
 اضحك من القلب "Laugh Your Heart " (2 February 2016)
 تشكيلات "Formations" (2017)
 ابطال واشرار "Heroes and Villains" (2017)
 فقرة بوميرانغ "Boomerang Block" (28 October 2018 – 1 February 2019)
سينما كرتون نتورك "Cinema Cartoon Network" (2012 – 2021)

 كرتون نتورك الكلاسيكية "Cartoon Network Classics" (1 October 2020 – 1 November 2020)
أبطال كرتون نتورك الخارقين "Cartoon Network Super Heroes" (6 September 2020 – 1 January 2021)
في المنزل مع عائلة واترسون "At Home With the Watersons" (5 July 2020 – 1 October 2021)
الصداقة انسجام "Friendship is Dynamic" (3 January 2021 – 1 April 2021)
نجم الشهر "Star of the Month" (25 April 2020 – 25 December 2021)
كن صديق "Be Friend" (5 November 2021)

Arabic version of Cartoonito

In 2011, Turner Broadcasting System Europe had announced that it would roll out its UK-based preschoolers' channel Cartoonito across Europe, the Middle East and Africa, increasing the brand's distribution to 125 million homes in 112 territories. On Cartoon Network Arabic, Cartoonito was launched as a morning block broadcast every day starting from 4 September 2011. However, the block was phased out on 1 April 2014, with some of its shows no longer available (although Baby Looney Tunes broadcasts on Boomerang HD and LazyTown airs on CN Arabic early in the morning).

However, the Cartoonito block returned on 24 March 2019 with 4 shows, 1 returning is Baby Looney Tunes with 3 new additions to Cartoonito which are Grizzy and the Lemmings, Pat the Dog and Fireman Sam.

On 17 May 2020, the Cartoonito block has been expanded from being broadcast at 6:30 KSA, and runs until 10:30 KSA. But last month, the block logo has been changed and made a new logo mixed between CARTOON (from Cartoon Network) and OO & ito (from Cartoonito).

On 6 February 2022, Cartoonito rebranded with the new 2021 logo and bumpers alongside its Turkish counterpart as part of the brand's Global re-introduction.

Programming 
The Adventures of Chuck and Friends
Pingu
Jelly Jamm
Ben 10
Krypto the Superdog
Bananas in Pyjamas
Baby Looney Tunes
Alice & Lewis
44 Cats
Taffy
The Tom and Jerry Show
The Happos Family
Pat the Dog
Oddbods
New Looney Tunes
Mr. Bean: The Animated Series
Grizzy and the Lemmings
Kingdom Force
Mush-Mush and the Mushables
Lego City Adventures
LazyTown
Dorothy and the Wizard of Oz
Thomas & Friends: All Engines Go
Wacky Races
Yabba-Dabba Dinosaurs
Tom & Jerry Kids
Mighty Mike
Driver Dan's Story Train
Ha Ha Hairies
Pound Puppies
Gerald McBoing-Boing
A Pup Named Scooby-Doo
Fireman Sam

Other versions and related channels

Cartoon Network Arabic HD
In March 2012, Cartoon Network Arabic became available in true high-definition via the YahLive service. The channel was eventually moved under beIN Network's service after the exclusivity deal was in effect in January 2016. In May 2016, the channel was suspended in favor of Cartoon Network MENA and Boomerang MENA that were later launched in July that year, as they both feature an Arabic audio track.

Cartoon Network Arabic +2
A two-hour timeshift channel variant launched on 30 June 2014 via the My-HD pay TV network. It was terminated on 1 January 2016 as a consequence of Turner Broadcasting System Arabia's deal with beIN Media Group.

Cartoon Network Hindi

On 1 April 2016, Qatar-based beIN Media Group, in association with Turner Broadcasting System Arabia, launched Cartoon Network Hindi exclusively via beIN. Cartoon Network Hindi provides children's animated programming to most South Asian expatriates in the Arab World countries outside of India. As the name implies, the channel is only available in Hindi, which is akin to the Arab World's own pan-aired channel.

References

External links

Arabic-language television stations
Cartoon Network
Children's television networks
Mass media in Dubai
Television channels and stations established in 2010
Turner Broadcasting System Europe
Free-to-air
Television stations in the United Arab Emirates
Television stations in Saudi Arabia
Television stations in Egypt
Television channels in Jordan
Television stations in the State of Palestine
Television stations in Iraq
Television stations in Algeria
Television stations in Libya
Television stations in Lebanon
Television channels in Syria
Television stations in Morocco
Television stations in Kuwait
Television stations in Sudan
Television stations in Yemen